"Somebody" is a song performed by American recording artist Bridgit Mendler for the soundtrack Lemonade Mouth to the Disney Channel television movie of the same name. It was written by Lindy Robbins and Reed Vertelney and released as the album's debut single on March 4, 2011 through Walt Disney Records.

Background and composition
"Somebody" is the first single released from the soundtrack Lemonade Mouth (2011), for the Disney Channel television movie of the same name. It was produced by Reed Vertelney, who also co-wrote with Lindy Robbins. Musically, the song is pop rock. Mendler's vocals span from the low note of F3 to the high note of E5.

Critical reception
Pop Dust criticized the lack of consistency in the production of the song, calling it as unattractive: "The song's not that bad—it's professionally mediocre at the very least—but it's hard to not wish that Disney had used this chance to at least attempt to humor the teenage-outsider contingent. Something to demonstrate at least token awareness of high-school misfitdom extending beyond the slightly goofier Jonas Brothers".

Chart performance
The song debuted (and peaked) at number 89 on the US Billboard Hot 100 and number 12 on the US Billboard Heatseekers chart. In its first week, the song sold 6,000 copies in the United States according to Nielsen SoundScan.

Music video
A lyrics music video was released on the Disney website later that same day. On March 18, 2011, the official music video for the song premiered on Disney Channel during a special Prom-themed episode of The Suite Life on Deck. It was directed by Brandon Dickerson.

Track listings
Digital download
 Somebody — 3:28

Charts

Release history

References 

2011 debut singles
Bridgit Mendler songs
Songs written by Lindy Robbins
Walt Disney Records singles
2011 songs
Songs written by Reed Vertelney